University of Foreign Languages may refer to:

Beijing Foreign Studies University, Beijing, China
Beijing International Studies University, Beijing, China
Beijing Language and Culture University, Beijing, China
Dalian University of Foreign Languages, Dalian, China
Guangdong University of Foreign Studies, Guangzhou, China
Shanghai International Studies University, Shanghai, China
Sichuan International Studies University, Chongqing, China
Tianjin Foreign Studies University, Tianjin, China
Xi'an International Studies University, Xi'an, China
English and Foreign Languages University, Hyderabad, India
Kanda University of International Studies, Chiba, Japan
Kansai Gaidai University, Hirakata, Osaka, Japan
Kobe City University of Foreign Studies, Kobe, Japan
Kyoto University of Foreign Studies, Kyoto, Japan
Nagasaki University of Foreign Studies, Nagasaki, Japan
Nagoya University of Foreign Studies, Nagoya, Japan
Tokyo University of Foreign Studies, Fuchū, Tokyo, Japan
Pyongyang University of Foreign Studies, Pyongyang, North Korea
Busan University of Foreign Studies, Busan, South Korea
Hankuk University of Foreign Studies, Seoul, South Korea
Mandalay University of Foreign Languages, Mandalay, Myanmar
Yangon University of Foreign Languages, Yangon, Myanmar
Wenzao Ursuline University of Languages, Kaohsiung, Taiwan
Ho Chi Minh City University of Foreign Languages and Information Technology, Ho Chi Minh City, Vietnam